Dibak may refer to:
 Dibak, Khoy
 Dibak, Maku